Dr. Irene Aguilar (born April 5, 1960) is a former Democratic member of the Colorado Senate. She represented the 32nd district from 2011 to early 2019. Her district encompassed part of the city of Denver, Colorado.

Personal Life & Education
Born in Chicago, Illinois, Aguilar completed her undergraduate degree at Washington University in St. Louis.  She received a medical degree from University of Chicago- Pritzker School of Medicine.

Career 
Aguilar was appointed by Governor Romer to the Colorado Board of Medical Examiners in 1993, where she served for eight years.  She has since continued to serve the board as a consultant. She was appointed to her first term in the State Senate in December 2010 after being chosen by a vacancy committee to replace Sen. Chris Romer.

In the 2011 session of the Colorado General Assembly, Aguilar was Vice-Chair of the Business, Labor and Technology Committee, and a member of the Health and Human Services Committee and the Local Government and Energy Committee.

References

External links
Legislative website

Democratic Party Colorado state senators
Living people
Politicians from Chicago
1960 births
Washington University in St. Louis alumni
Pritzker School of Medicine alumni
Women state legislators in Colorado
21st-century American politicians
21st-century American women politicians